César Augusto Carrasco Gómez is a Mexican politician affiliated with the Institutional Revolutionary Party. As of 2014 he served as Deputy of the LIX Legislature of the Mexican Congress representing Oaxaca as replacement of José Guzmán Santos.

References

Date of birth unknown
Living people
Politicians from Oaxaca
Institutional Revolutionary Party politicians
Year of birth missing (living people)
21st-century Mexican politicians
Deputies of the LIX Legislature of Mexico
Members of the Chamber of Deputies (Mexico) for Oaxaca